Woldemar Voigt (2 September 1850 – 13 December 1919) was a German physicist, who taught at the Georg August University of Göttingen.  Voigt eventually went on to head the Mathematical Physics Department at Göttingen and was succeeded in 1914 by Peter Debye, who took charge of the theoretical department of the Physical Institute.  In 1921, Debye was succeeded by Max Born.

Biography
Voigt was born in Leipzig, and died in Göttingen. He was a student of Franz Ernst Neumann. He worked on crystal physics, thermodynamics and electro-optics. His main work was the Lehrbuch der Kristallphysik (textbook on crystal physics), first published in 1910. He discovered the Voigt effect in 1898. The word tensor in its current meaning was introduced by him in 1898. Voigt profile and Voigt notation are named after him. He was also an amateur musician and became known as a Bach expert (see External links).

In 1887 Voigt formulated a form of the Lorentz transformation between a rest frame of reference and a frame moving with speed  in the  direction. However, as Voigt himself said, the transformation was aimed at a specific problem and did not carry with it the idea of a general coordinate transformation, as is the case in relativity theory.

The Voigt transformation

In modern notation Voigt's transformation was

where .
Hermann Minkowski said in 1908 that the transformations which play the main role in the principle of relativity were first examined by Voigt in 1887. Also Hendrik Lorentz (1909) is on record as saying that he could have taken these transformations into his theory of electrodynamics, if only he had known of them, rather than developing his own. It is interesting then to examine the consequences of these transformations from this point of view. Lorentz might then have seen that the transformation introduced relativity of simultaneity, and also time dilation. However, the magnitude of the dilation was greater than the now accepted value in the Lorentz transformations. Moving clocks, obeying Voigt's time transformation, indicate an elapsed time
, while stationary clocks indicate an elapsed time .

Since Voigt's transformation preserves the speed of light in all frames, the Michelson–Morley experiment and the Kennedy–Thorndike experiment can not distinguish between the two transformations. The crucial question is the issue of time dilation. The experimental measurement of time dilation by Ives and Stillwell (1938) and others settled the issue in favor of the Lorentz transformation.

See also
Dyakonov–Voigt wave
Stark effect
German inventors and discoverers

References

Primary Sources

; This article ends with the announcement that in a forthcoming article the principles worked out so far shall be applied to the problems of reflection and refraction. The article contains on p. 235, last paragraph, and on p. 236, 2nd paragraph, a judgment on the Michelson experiment of 1886, which Voigt, after a correspondence with H. A. Lorentz in 1887 and 1888, has partly withdrawn in the article announced, namely in a footnote in Voigt (1888). According to Voigt's first judgment, the Michelson experiment must yield a null result, independently of whether the Earth transports the luminiferous aether with it (Fizeau's 1st aether hypothesis), or whether the Earth moves through an entirely independent, self-consistent universal luminiferous aether (Fizeau's 2nd aether hypothesis).
; In a footnote on p. 390 of this article, Voigt corrects his earlier judgment, made in Göttinger Nachrichten No. 8, p. 235 and p. 236 (1887), and states indirectly that, after a correspondence with H. A. Lorentz, he can no longer maintain that in the case of the validity of Fizeau's 2nd aether hypothesis the Michelson experiment must yield a null result too.
; For Minkowski's statement see p. 762.
; See p. 198.
 Lorentz 1904, Electromagnetic phenomena in a system moving with any velocity smaller than that of light

Secondary sources

 Ernst, Andreas & Hsu Jong-Ping (June 2001); First Proposal of the Universal Speed of Light by Voigt in 1887, pdf Chinese Journal of Physics

External links

 

 The relativity of light (MathPages)
 Bach expert Woldemar Voigt
 

1850 births
1919 deaths
19th-century German physicists
Scientists from Leipzig
People from the Kingdom of Saxony
Leipzig University alumni
University of Königsberg alumni
Academic staff of the University of Königsberg
Academic staff of the University of Göttingen
Foreign Members of the Royal Society
20th-century German physicists